Mykola Vasylyovych Hnatyuk or Mykola Vasyliovych Hnatiuk (born 14 September 1952) is a Soviet, Ukrainian singer, popular in the early 1980s.

In 1979 he won the Grand Prix at the Dresden Pop Music Festival with David Tukhmanov's  I Dance With You . A year later Dancing on the Drum  (penned by Raimonds Pauls) brought Hnatyuk the 1980 Sopot Intervision Song Contest Grand Prix, and made him famous at home. A year later came out  Bird of Fortune  (by the Pakhmutova-Dobronravov songwriting team), another huge hit for him. 

In 1988 Hnatyuk was awarded the title The People's Artist of the Ukrainian SSR.

Notes

References

External links
 Mykola Hnatyuk, giving credit to Raimonds Pauls for his triumph in Sopot (YouTube, in Russian)

1952 births
People from Khmelnytskyi Oblast
Soviet pop singers
Ukrainian pop singers
Living people
Soviet musicians
Recipients of the Order of Francysk Skaryna
Recipients of the title of People's Artists of Ukraine
Recipients of the title of Merited Artist of Ukraine